A Tribute to Jack Teagarden (released 2013 in Oslo, Norway by the label Herman Records – HJCD1043) is the second album by the Norwegian trombonist Kristoffer Kompen.

Critical reception 

The review by Terje Mosnes of the Norwegian newspaper Dagbladet awarded the album 5 dice and said that "With his quartet, Kompen takes hold of the music, including Teagarden own "Swingin' on the Teagarden Gate", and he does so with impressive tonal formation and suppleness of phrasing. Although Kompen the recent years has emerged as equally comfortable in modern jazz expression as in trad jazz, it seems that the musical heart of his beats with extra power in the evergreen melody landscape."

Track listing 
All compositions by Jack Teagarden
"Old Folks"
"I Gotta Right to Sing the Blues"
"Lover"
"Swingin' on the Teagarden Gate"
"Diane"
"Misery and the Blues"
"Love Mee"
"Nobody Knows the Trouble I've Seen"
"I Swung the Election"
"A Hundred Years from Today"
"Baby, Won't You Please Come Home"
"Stars Fell On Alabama"

Personnel 
Kristoffer Kompen Quartet
Kristoffer Kompen - trombone
David Skinner - piano
Børre Frydenlund - guitar & vocals
Svein Otto Aarbostad - double bass
Tore Sandbakken - drums

References 

Kristoffer Kompen albums
2013 albums
Jack Teagarden tribute albums